The following list contains the world's 50 largest family businesses by revenue. All data comes from the Family Business Index 500 report by the British auditing firm Ernst & Young and the University of St. Gallen, which lists the 500 largest family businesses in the world. All 500 companies on the list had a combined turnover of $7.3 trillion in 2020. Companies that have not published financial statements in the last 24 months are not included in the ranking.

In 2020, U.S. retailer Walmart was the largest family business company in the world, with sales of more than $500 billion.

Top 50 
The ranking only lists companies that are managed by the same family in at least the second generation. To qualify as a family business, family members must continue to be involved in the management of the company, either on the board of directors, in the executive management or on the supervisory board. In addition, the family must hold at least 50 percent of the shares or voting rights in private companies and at least 32 percent of the shares in public companies.

References 

 
family businesses